Sverre Kornelius Eilertsen Støstad (13 May 1887 – 7 December 1959) was the Norwegian Minister of Social Affairs 1939–1945, and member of the government delegation in Oslo in 1945, as well as head of the Ministry of Supplies and Reconstruction.

1887 births
1959 deaths
Government ministers of Norway
Members of the Storting
Labour Party (Norway) politicians
Communist Party of Norway politicians
20th-century Norwegian politicians